Euphorbia friedrichiae is a species of plant in the family Euphorbiaceae. It is endemic to Namibia.

Habitat: It grows only in one locality on the Quatar Saleh (or Jebel Hassala) in a very arid area at an elevation of about 150 to 270 m in the middle of the mountain on limestone outcrops and granitic gravel slopes where they forms open thickets.

References

Endemic flora of Namibia
Least concern plants
friedrichiae
Taxonomy articles created by Polbot
Taxa named by Kurt Dinter